Willard A. "Dutch" Witte (April 3, 1906 – February 13, 1966) was the head men's basketball and football coach of the University of Wyoming from 1930–31 through 1938–39 (basketball) and 1933 through 1938 (football). He led the Cowboys basketball team to an overall record of 134–51 in his tenure. His 1933–34 team, led by his younger brother and two-time consensus All-American Les Witte, finished 26–4 and were retroactively named national champions by the Helms Athletic Foundation. He died in 1966 at a hospital in Fremont, Nebraska. He also coached Wyoming to three division titles and two outright conference championships. He was inducted in the University of Wyoming Hall of Fame on September 12, 2003.

Head coaching record

Football

Basketball

References

External links
 University of Wyoming Hall of Fame entry
 Willard Witte basketball coaching statistics @ sports-reference.com
 

1906 births
1966 deaths
American men's basketball coaches
American men's basketball players
Basketball coaches from Nebraska
Basketball players from Nebraska
College men's basketball head coaches in the United States
Nebraska Cornhuskers football players
Nebraska Cornhuskers men's basketball players
Players of American football from Nebraska
Sportspeople from Lincoln, Nebraska
Wyoming Cowboys and Cowgirls athletic directors
Wyoming Cowboys basketball coaches
Wyoming Cowboys football coaches